Fayetteville is a city in and the county seat of Fayette County, Georgia, United States. As of the 2020 census, the city had a population of 18,957, up from 15,945 at the 2010 census.

In 2015 the city elected its first African-American mayor, Edward Johnson, a retired US navy commander and pastor. He was previously a three-term president of the NAACP and a city council member in Fayetteville.

History

Fayetteville was founded in 1822 as the seat of the newly formed Fayette County, organized by European Americans from territory ceded by force the Creek people under a treaty with the United States during the early period of Indian removal from the Southeast. Both city and county were named in honor of the Revolutionary War hero the French Marquis de Lafayette. Fayetteville was incorporated as a town in 1823 and as a city in 1902.

The area was developed for cotton plantations, with labor provided by enslaved African Americans, who for more than a century comprised the majority of the county's population. Fayetteville became the trading town for the agricultural area.

In the first half of the 20th century, as agriculture became more mechanized, many African-American workers left the area in the Great Migration to northern and midwestern industrial cities, which had more jobs and offered less oppressive social conditions.

A reverse migration has brought new residents to the South, and the city of Fayetteville has grown markedly since 2000, as has the county. The city's population increased from 11,148 in 2000 to 18,957 in 2020.

Government
The city has a mayor-council form of elected government. Five council members are elected at-large, in non-partisan post, and the mayor is elected at-large in a non-partisan race.

In 2015 Ed Johnson was elected mayor, the first African American to serve in the position. The retired US Naval Commander and pastor of Fayette County's oldest black church is described as a consensus builder. In 2011 Johnson was elected as the first black member of the city council after having served three terms as president of the local chapter of the NAACP.

Johnson was re-elected in 2019.

Demographics

2020 census

As of the 2020 United States census, there were 18,957 people, 6,833 households, and 4,833 families residing in the city.

2010 census
As of the 2010 census, there were 15,945 people, 6,006 households, and 4,264 families residing in the city. The racial makeup of the city was 55.0% White, 33.9% African American, 0.4% Native American, 6.6% Asian, 0.1% Pacific Islander, 1.3% from other races, and 2.8% from two or more races. Hispanic or Latino people of any race were 4.8% of the population.

Out of the 6,006 households, 39.7% had individuals under the age of 18. 51.8% of households were married couples living together, 16.0% had a female householder with no husband present, and 29.0% were non-families. 26.4% of all households were made up of individuals, and 12.0% had someone living alone who was 65 years of age or older. The average household size was 2.59, and the average family size was 3.14.

In the city, the age distribution was 26.7% under the age of 18, 7.4% from 18 to 24, 9.1% from 25 to 34, 15.4% from 35 to 44, 15.9% from 45 to 54, 11.4% from 55 to 64, and 14.0% who were 65 years of age or older. The median age was 39.9 years. The population was 54.4% female and 45.6% male.

As of the most recent community survey, the median income for a household in the city was $62,037 and the median income for a family was $81,613. About 6.5% of families and 8.9% of the population were below the poverty line, including 13.3% of those under age 18 and 6.1% of those age 65 or over.

Education
The city is served by the Fayette County Board of Education.

In 2016, a soundstage at Pinewood Studios was open for educational use by the Georgia Film Academy. In late 2020, the Georgia Film Academy partnered with Trilith and the University of Georgia to launch its Master of Fine Arts film program; students would work and live in Trilith during their second year. Trilith also has a small K-12 school called the Forest School.

Georgia Military College has a campus in Fayetteville.

Points of interest
The Fayette County Courthouse, built in 1825 four years after the county and town's founding, is the oldest surviving courthouse in Georgia. It is located in the center of the Fayetteville town square. Since the construction of a new courthouse, the 1825 building has been adapted for use as the local welcome center. It holds offices for Fayetteville Main Street and the Fayette County Development Authority.

The Holliday-Dorsey-Fife House was built in 1855 by John Stiles Holliday, uncle of the western gambler John Henry "Doc" Holliday.  

The Margaret Mitchell Library, built in 1948 and named in honor of the author, serves as the headquarters of the Fayette County Historical Society. Among its holdings are Civil War and genealogical records.

The residence formally occupied by deceased professional wrestler Chris Benoit and his nuclear family until June 2007, within which a high-profile double-murder and suicide tragedy occurred, is located in Fayetteville.

Trilith Studios, then Pinewood Atlanta Studios, opened here in 2014; it was a joint venture between British company Pinewood Group and River's Rock LLC, an independently managed trust of the Cathy family, founders of the Chick-fil-A fast-food chain. In 2020 River Rock bought out Pinewood's share of the studio. It is the largest film and television production studio in the United States outside the state of California. The studio has produced many large budget films, including several in the Marvel Cinematic Universe such as Avengers: Infinity War, Avengers: Endgame, and Black Panther.

In 2016, the Pinewood Forest mixed-use complex was launched. Located across the street from the studio, it features homes along with plans for "a movie theater, restaurants, boutique hotels, retail and office space", built using environmentally friendly building materials. In 2020, when the studio was renamed Trilith Studios, Pinewood Forest was renamed the Town at Trilith. In April 2021, Atlanta magazine ranked the community ninth in their top ten metro Atlanta vibrant city centers list; the community was also the newest featured on the list.

Notable people
Andrew Adams, football player for Tampa Bay Buccaneers
Paris Bennett, American Idol Season 5: fifth place finalist
Chris Benoit, professional wrestler
Nancy Benoit, professional wrestling manager
Brandon Boykin, former NFL player for Philadelphia Eagles
Zac Brown, Grammy Award-winning country music singer 
Tonya Butler, football player
Phil Cofer, basketball player for the Florida State Seminoles
Matt Daniels, football player for St. Louis Rams
John Deraney, football player for Detroit Lions
Creflo Dollar, televangelist
Hugh M. Dorsey, governor of Georgia
Kyle Dugger, football player for New England Patriots
Mike Duke, former CEO of Walmart
Niko Goodrum, Major League Baseball player for the Detroit Tigers
Mike Hilton, NFL defensive back
Ufomba Kamalu, NFL defensive end for Houston Texans
Emmanuel Lewis, actor, Webster
Sam Martin, football player for Denver Broncos
Christopher Massey, actor, musician, director, film producer
Kyle Massey, actor, musician, Dancing with the Stars
Ann Nesby, Grammy Award-winning singer and actress
Kelley O'Hara, player for United States women's national soccer team and Utah Royals FC in the National Women's Soccer League; Olympic and World Cup champion
Paul Orndorff, professional wrestler
Plumb (born Tiffany Arbuckle Lee), songwriter, recording artist, performer and author
Keshia Knight Pulliam, actress, The Cosby Show, Tyler Perry's House of Payne
William Regal (born Darren Matthews), English professional wrestler
Rick Ross, rapper 
Nellie Mae Rowe, folk artist
Ferrol Sams, author
Jabari Smith Jr., NBA forward
Speech, leader of Arrested Development
Christian Taylor (athlete), track and field athlete, Olympic gold medalist
Anna Watson, "The World's Strongest Cheerleader"
Gary Anthony Williams, actor and star of Special Agent Oso on Disney Channel

References

External links
 City of Fayetteville official website
 Fayetteville Downtown Development Authority

Cities in Georgia (U.S. state)
Cities in Fayette County, Georgia
County seats in Georgia (U.S. state)